The Hungarian Order of Saint Stephen (Hungarian: Magyar Szent István Rend) is the highest state honour bestowed by the President of Hungary. The order is made up of one grade which is "Grand Cross".

History 
The order's origins can be traced back to an order of chivalry founded in 1764 by Queen Maria Theresa which lasted upon the dissolution of Austria-Hungary in 1918. The order was subsequently revived in 1938 following a decree by Hungary's Regent Miklós Horthy, thereby renaming the order as the Royal Hungarian Order of Saint Stephen and acting as its Grand Master. Following the proclamation of the Second Hungarian Republic in 1946, the order was terminated. Finally, in 2011, the order was revived by Presidential decree as the Hungarian Order of Saint Stephen.

Insignia 
The insignia included in the presentation box, from left-to-right & top-to-bottom, feature:

 Breast star
 Sash
 Ribbon bar
 Miniature
 Alternative medal
 Rosette

List of members

References 

Orders, decorations, and medals of Hungary